Corporal Joel Halliwell  (29 December 1881 – 14 June 1958) was an English recipient of the Victoria Cross, the highest and most prestigious award for gallantry in the face of the enemy that can be awarded to British and Commonwealth forces.

Details
Halliwell was 37 years old, and a lance-corporal in the 11th Battalion, The Lancashire Fusiliers, British Army during the First World War when he performed a deed on 27 May 1918 at Muscourt, France, during the Third Battle of the Aisne for which he was awarded the Victoria Cross.

The citation reads;

The medal and later history
For conspicuous bravery and devotion to duty, he was awarded the Victoria Cross. He died at age 76 in Greater Manchester, England. The medal is in Middleton, Greater Manchester with his family, and Joel Halliwell is buried with distinction at nearby Boarshaw Cemetery, with the inscription on his stone which reads 'For Valour'...'These Are Deeds That Should Not Pass Away, And Names That Must Not Wither'.

In 2014, Joel Haliwell and his descendents (his daughter and other relatives) featured in one of the two special World War I episodes of the BBC programme The Antiques Roadshow. Haliwell's story was recounted, and the family visited the grave of Joel's brother Tom, who had been killed in 1916.

See also
Monuments to Courage (David Harvey, 1999)
The Register of the Victoria Cross (This England, 1997)
VCs of the First World War (Gerald Gliddon, 1997)

References

External links
Middleton
Location of grave and VC medal (Lancashire)

1881 births
1956 deaths
Burials in Lancashire
People from Middleton, Greater Manchester
British World War I recipients of the Victoria Cross
Lancashire Fusiliers soldiers
British Army personnel of World War I
British Army recipients of the Victoria Cross
Military personnel from Lancashire